Selly Oak Pumping Station was a water pumping station operating in Selly Oak, Birmingham, England, from 1878 until the 1920s.

History

It was built by the Birmingham Corporation Waterworks department in 1878 to house a Boulton and Watt steam engine pumping water for domestic use from a borehole underneath the building. The building is in the Gothic style and was designed by Martin & Chamberlain. It appears as a French Gothic Royal Chapel. The building became unnecessary with the opening of the Elan aqueduct, and it was converted into an electricity sub-station.

It is Grade II listed.

References

Buildings and structures in the West Midlands (county)
Gothic Revival architecture in the West Midlands (county)
Grade II listed buildings in Birmingham
Infrastructure completed in 1878
Water supply in Birmingham, West Midlands
Water supply pumping stations
Selly Oak